
The year 505 BC was a year of the pre-Julian Roman calendar. In the Roman Empire it was known as the Year of the Consulship of Volusus and Tubertus (or, less frequently, year 249  Ab urbe condita). The denomination 505 BC for this year has been used since the early medieval period, when the Anno Domini calendar era became the prevalent method in Europe for naming years.

Events 
 By place 

 Roman Republic 
 A war between Rome and the Sabines begins, concluding in 504 BC.

References